Liolaemus lavillai is a species of lizard in the family Iguanidae.  It is found in Argentina.

References

lavillai
Lizards of South America
Reptiles of Argentina
Endemic fauna of Argentina
Reptiles described in 2006
Taxa named by Cristian Simón Abdala